The Montenegro national football team has represented Montenegro in international football since 2007. It is controlled by the Football Association of Montenegro, the governing body for football in Montenegro. Montenegro's home ground is Podgorica City Stadium in Podgorica.

Montenegro is one of the world's youngest international teams, having joined FIFA and UEFA in 2007, following the restoration of Montenegrin independence in 2006. Montenegro played its first official international match against Hungary in March 2007, and competed in their first FIFA World Cup qualifiers in 2010.

History

Formation

Following the independence of Montenegro from Serbia and Montenegro, Serbia was set to represent both Serbia and Montenegro in the Euro 2008 qualifying stage. UEFA, however, would be willing to include Montenegro as a late entry if FIFA ratified a separate Montenegrin Football Association before September 2006. However, this did not occur before the competition began.
In October 2006, Montenegro was granted provisional membership of UEFA, with a debate regarding full membership scheduled at a full UEFA Congress in January 2007. Montenegro's first FIFA World Ranking was joint 199th place, the last place on the list by default.

First matches

On 26 January 2007, the Montenegro FA was granted full membership of UEFA. The team played its first FIFA-recognized friendly match against Hungary on 24 March 2007 at Stadion Pod Goricom in Podgorica. Montenegro won 2–1 in front of 12,000 spectators. Striker Mirko Vučinić scored the country's first goal in the 62nd minute. On 31 May 2007, Montenegro was admitted as FIFA's 208th member.
Montenegro's first coach was Zoran Filipović. In 23 matches, Filipović recorded eight victories, eight draws and seven defeats. He left in January 2010 when his contract expired. During his tenure, Montenegro rose to 73rd position in the FIFA rankings.
Montenegro played at the 2007 Kirin Cup, but finished in last place behind Japan and Colombia.
On 26 March 2008, Montenegro recorded one of its best results with a 3–1 win over Norway.

First competitive matches
On 6 September 2008, Montenegro played their first World Cup qualifier against Bulgaria at the Podgorica City Stadium. Bulgaria took the lead in the 11th minute with a goal from Stiliyan Petrov. Mirko Vučinić scored in the 61st minute to tie the game, before Igor Burzanović put Montenegro ahead 82nd minute from a penalty. However, a last-minute equalizer from Blagoy Georgiev denied Montenegro their first competitive win. In their next match on 10 September, they achieved another notable result when they held the Republic of Ireland to a 0–0 draw.
Another near-upset came in a narrow 2–1 loss against Italy. After Alberto Aquilani's early strike, Vučinić quickly equalized, but Aquilani scored the winning goal ten minutes later. Their second match against Italy ended 2–0 in favour of the world champions. Another disappointment came when the team could only draw 0–0 against Georgia, followed by a 2–2 draw against Cyprus after being two goals down. On 5 September 2009, Montenegro took an early lead against Bulgaria in Sofia with Stevan Jovetić putting them 1–0 up, only for Bulgaria to recover and win 4–1. After drawing 1–1 with Cyprus, Montenegro finally registered their first competitive win, beating Georgia 2–1. They then drew 0–0 with the Republic of Ireland at Croke Park. They finished fifth in the group with nine points, below Cyprus on goal difference.

Golden era
During the UEFA Euro 2012 qualification campaign, the team recorded further success. They opened their campaign with a 1–0 victory over Wales; Mirko Vučinić scored the only goal. A few days later, the team defeated Bulgaria 1–0 in Sofia. The next month, they beat Switzerland 1–0 and then recorded a 0–0 draw in London against England. On 4 June 2011, Montenegro drew 1–1 against Bulgaria, with Radomir Đalović scoring for Montenegro early in the second half, but Ivelin Popov scoring minutes later, to keep Montenegro second in the group, behind England on goal difference.
Montenegro were beaten 2–1 by Wales in Cardiff. They were still second in Group G, but Switzerland closed the gap between them to only three points.
In the June 2011 FIFA rankings, Montenegro recorded their highest ranking of 16th.
On 7 October, Montenegro came back from 2–0 down to draw 2–2 against England in Podgorica, after Wayne Rooney was sent off. Wales beat Switzerland 2–0 to ensure Montenegro won a play-off place, putting the team two matches away from qualifying for Euro 2012. In their last match in the qualifiers, Montenegro lost 2–0 to Switzerland in Basel. On 13 October, the draw for the UEFA Euro 2012 qualifying play-offs was held in Kraków, Poland. Montenegro were paired with the Czech Republic, but they lost 3–0 on aggregate and failed to qualify.
Montenegro were drawn in Group H in the qualifiers, along with England, Poland, Ukraine, Moldova and San Marino.
In their first match, Montenegro tied against Poland in a 2–2 draw. On 11 September, Montenegro played against San Marino in Seravalle. In a one-sided match, Montenegro won 6–0, the biggest win in the team's history. Montenegro then beat Ukraine 1–0 in Kyiv, with the only goal scored by Dejan Damjanović. In their last match in 2012, Montenegro faced San Marino in Podgorica on 14 November, and won 3–0.

Montenegro played their fifth qualifier match against Moldova in Chișinău on 22 March 2013, winning 1–0 through Mirko Vučinić's goal. Montenegro then returned to Podgorica to play the second-placed England. The outcome was a 1–1 draw.

Leading their World Cup qualifying group, Montenegro hosted Ukraine on 7 June 2013. They suffered their first defeat in the group, losing 4–0. The match also saw Montenegro finish the match with nine men after Vladimir Volkov and Savo Pavićević were sent off. Their last four matches yielded just a single point; a 1–1 draw in Poland. Their 2014 World Cup qualifying campaign finished with a 5–2 home defeat to Moldova, and they finished third behind England and Ukraine.

Ups and downs
On 23 February 2014 in Nice, Montenegro were drawn for qualification in UEFA Euro 2016 qualifying Group G alongside Russia, Sweden, Austria, Moldova and Liechtenstein. Though they opened their campaign with a 2–0 win over Moldova, they failed to qualify with a 0–0 tie against Liechtenstein, a 1–0 loss to Austria and a 1–1 tie at home to Sweden.
On 27 March 2015, Montenegro's home match against Russia was abandoned after 67 minutes due to crowd violence, after the Russian left-back Dmitri Kombarov was hit by a projectile. The score was 0–0 and Russia had missed a penalty moments before the match was abandoned. The Russian goalkeeper Igor Akinfeev was hit by a flare, causing a second 33-minute delay. The abandoned match was ruled a 3–0 win in Russia's favour.
Montenegro finished fourth at the end of the campaign and placed 95th on the FIFA ranking list.
Montenegro participated in the 2018 FIFA World Cup qualification and were placed with Poland, Denmark, Kazakhstan, Armenia and Romania. Poland and Romania had been participants in the UEFA Euro 2016, but Montenegro began by drawing 1–1 away to Romania, beating Kazakhstan 5–0 at home and defeating Denmark 1–0. However, they then lost 3–2 away to Armenia despite leading 2–0, and were defeated 2–1 at home by Poland. Montenegro then rebounded, beating Armenia 4–1 and Kazakhstan 3–0. They later eliminated Romania with a 1–0 victory, but losses to the Danes and Poles ended Montenegro's chance of qualifying.
Having failed to reach the World Cup, Montenegro had a dismal performance in the 2018–19 UEFA Nations League C. The team was grouped with Serbia, Romania and Lithuania. Montenegro only managed two victories, all against Lithuania, and suffered two losses to Serbia, one defeat to Romania at home and an away draw to the Romanian side as well. This effectively denied Montenegro a chance to qualify to the UEFA Euro 2020 playoff.

Worst campaign
The Euro 2020 qualifiers for Montenegro have been the worst in the team's short history. After an unsuccessful Nations League campaign, the team started off with a 1–1 away draw to Bulgaria, following a controversial penalty for the hosts. It was followed with a 1–5 loss at home to England despite having taken an early lead. 
On the day of the match with Kosovo, Serbian coach Ljubiša Tumbaković and two players originated from Serbia, due to political reasons, abandoned the national team, betraying the squad in unprecedented condition before the two crucial matches for qualifiers. Montenegro managed to avoid defeat against Kosovo (1-1), however they lost to Czech Republic 0–3. The same result occurred in the rematch, one month later. With no chances to qualify directly, Montenegro failed to win the match against last placed Bulgaria (0-0), and lost to Kosovo (0-2).
At the end of their worst campaign, Montenegro suffered their biggest defeat in history. On 14 November 2019, they were defeated against England in London 7–0.
Not only did they finish the qualifying campaign without a single victory, Montenegro managed to score only three goals in eight matches, but conceded 22. Also, throughout the entire qualifying campaign the team had troubles with injuries to key players, most notably Stevan Jovetić and Stefan Savić.

Comeback
The team topped the group in 2020-21 UEFA Nations League above Luxembourg, Azerbaijan and Cyprus and were promoted into League B. They were also an important team in fight to qualify for 2022 FIFA World Cup. They were 4th of 6 teams in group with Netherlands, Turkey, Norway, Latvia and Gibraltar.

Stadium and facilities

Montenegro play home matches at the Podgorica City Stadium. The stadium's capacity is 15,230, but international matches reduce this to between 10,700 and 13,000.

Camp FSCG

The Football Association of Montenegro owns Camp FSCG, a Montenegrin training ground. Built in 2007, the centre has a total area of 54,000 square metres. It is located on Ćemovsko polje, a plain located in the outskirts of Podgorica outskirts between the settlements of Stari Aerodrom and Konik. It consists of six pitches with stands and floodlights, and House of Football – the seat of the Football Association of Montenegro.

The camp currently represents an important asset for the whole Montenegrin football system. The grounds are home to all Montenegrin national teams (men and women) and numerous local teams from Podgorica. CAMP FSCG meets the criteria for Montenegrin First League games and UEFA competitions for young players.

Team image

Nickname
Under the official FIFA Trigramme, the team’s name is abbreviated as MNE, which is also the country's ISO 3166-1 code. The team's nickname is "The Brave Falcons".

Kits and colours
Montenegro's traditional home colours are red, with a gold trim. This reflects the country's flag. The team's away kits have usually been white, with a red trim.

The current  kit is produced by the Italian company Legea.

Supporters
At competitive matches, the Montenegrin home ground Podgorica City Stadium is often filled to capacity. The stadium is regarded as too small to meet the needs of the national team. Demand for the World Cup qualifier against Italy in 2009 was 30,000 tickets; 40,000 for the Euro 2012 qualifying match against England in 2011.

Montenegro's loudest and most loyal supporters are named Ultra Crna Gora (Ултра Црна Гора; Ultra Montenegro). As an ultras group, their support consists of standing up and singing for 90 minutes both home and away. They occupy the north and south stands of Podgorica City Stadium. Choreography is usually performed at the beginning of games. Ultra Crna Gora consists of many subgroups, mostly named after Podgorica's neighborhoods and Montenegrin towns in other parts of the country.

Results and fixtures

2022

2023

Coaching staff

Coaching history

Players
In international football, players can normally only play for one national team once they play in all or part of any match recognised as a full international by FIFA. However, an exception is made in cases where one or more newly independent states are created out of a former state. Based on current FIFA rules, a player will be eligible to play for Montenegro, even if he had previously represented Serbia and Montenegro or any other country, if at least one of the following statements applies:

The player was born in Montenegro;
At least one of their parents and/or at least one of their grandparents was born in Montenegro;
The player has lived in Montenegro continuously for any five-year period.

Due to mixed ancestries, it is likely that a high percentage of the players eligible to play for Montenegro will also remain eligible to play for Serbia, and vice versa. However, once they have played for either Serbia or Montenegro in any competitive fixture, they are no longer eligible to play for any other nation.

Current squad
The following players were called up for games against Bulgaria on 24 March and against Serbia on 27 March 2023.

Caps and goals as of 20 November 2022, after the match against Slovenia.

Recent call-ups
The following players have been called on the last 12 months.

Notes
INJ = Withdrew due to injury
PRE = Preliminary squad/standby
RET = Retired from the national team
SUS = Serving suspension
WD = Player withdrew from the squad due to non-injury issue.

Player records

Players in bold are still active at international level.

Most capped players

Top goalscorers

Competitive record
Montenegro have participated in seven qualification rounds for World Cup or European Championship tournaments. Montenegro have never qualified, and their biggest success was reaching the play-offs for Euro 2012.
Montenegro first tried to qualify for the 2010 World Cup in South Africa, but they finished fifth in their group. They had more success in the Euro 2012 qualifiers, when they finished second in their group to reach the play-offs, but lost to the Czech Republic.
In the qualifiers for the 2014 World Cup, Montenegro finished third, and two years later, in the qualifiers for Euro 2016, they finished fourth in their group. They again finished third in their 2018 World Cup qualifying group. Worst performance came in the qualifiers for Euro 2020, as Montenegro finished last-placed in the group without single victory.

Updated: 20 November 2022

FIFA World Cup

UEFA European Championship

UEFA Nations League

Head-to-head record
Below is a summary of Montenegrin national team results against every opponent country.

FIFA rankings

Montenegro national football team is present on FIFA rankings since June 2007. Until now, the best ranking of Montenegro was 16th place in the world (June 2011).
Below is a list of Montenegro position on FIFA ranking-list by every six months, with number of points.

See also

 Montenegro men's national football team results
 Montenegro men's national football team records and statistics
 List of Montenegro international footballers
 Montenegro women's national football team
 Montenegro women's national under-17 football team
 Football in Montenegro
 Sport in Montenegro

Notes

References

External links

 Football Association of Montenegro 
 FIFA.com (Montenegro) 
 UEFA.com (Montenegro) 
 List of players 
 Montenegro national team match reports 

 
European national association football teams